Tourneville-sur-Mer is a commune in the Manche department in Normandy in northern France. It was established on 1 January 2023 from the amalgamation of the communes of Annoville and Lingreville.

Etymology
Before the French Revolution, there was the parish of Tourneville, which today remains a hamlet adjoining Lingreville. This hamlet is the link between the two former municipalities.
The name sur-Mer was added to distinguish it with Tourneville in the Eure department, in the same region.

History
A project for a new municipality has been initiated with the municipalities of Annoville, Lingreville, Hauteville-sur-Mer, Montmartin-sur-Mer and Regnéville-sur-Mer as the study area. The mayor of Hauteville-sur-Mer was not in favor of it. Hauteville would back out of the proposal and the mayors of Regnéville and Montmartin also followed suit. However, the proposal continued with a reduced perimeter between the two neighboring municipalities of Annoville and Lingreville.

The two municipal councils adopt the project in early July 2022 and thus Annoville and Lingreville merged on 1 January 2023, forming Tourneville-sur-Mer.

References

Communes of Manche
2023 establishments in France
Populated places established in 2023